The final of the Women's 100 metres Breaststroke event at the European LC Championships 1997 was held on Friday 1997-08-22 in Seville, Spain.

Finals

Qualifying heats

See also
1996 Women's Olympic Games 100m Breaststroke
1997 Women's World Championships (SC) 100m Breaststroke

References
 scmsom results

B